The Arctic Circle is one of the five major circles of latitude that mark maps of the Earth.

Arctic Circle may also refer to:

Arts, entertainment, and media
Arctic Circle (TV series), a Finnish-German television series
"The Arctic Circle", the first track on the 2006 album He Poos Clouds by Owen Pallett

Brands and enterprises
Arctic Circle Air, an American airline based in Fairbanks, Alaska, USA
Arctic Circle Raceway, the biggest race track in Norway
Arctic Circle Restaurants, a chain of burger and shake restaurants based in Midvale, Utah, USA
FC Santa Claus Arctic Circle, a Finnish football club who use Arctic Circle as part of their official name since 2012

Other uses
Arctic Circle (organization), an international non-profit organization related to Arctic issues based in Reykjavík, Iceland
Arctic Circle", in the astronomy of the ancient Greeks was an observer-dependent circle on the celestial sphere, centred on the northern celestial pole and tangential to the horizon, within which all the northern circumpolar stars lie
Arctic circle theorem, in mathematics
Arctic Circle Trail, a trekking tour in West Greenland

See also
 Antarctic
 Antarctic Circle
 Arctic
 Celestial sphere
 Equator
 North Pole
 Polar (disambiguation)
 Polar circle
 South Pole
 Temperate Zone
 Tropic of Cancer
 Tropic of Capricorn